Paramyopsyche is a genus of moths in the subfamily Arctiinae. It contains the single species Paramyopsyche wittei, which is found in the Democratic Republic of Congo.

References

Natural History Museum Lepidoptera generic names catalog

Arctiinae
Endemic fauna of the Democratic Republic of the Congo